In statistics, the generalized canonical correlation analysis (gCCA), is a way of making sense of cross-correlation matrices between the sets of random variables when there are more than two sets. While a conventional CCA generalizes principal component analysis (PCA) to two sets of random variables, a gCCA  generalizes PCA to more than two sets of random variables. The canonical variables represent those common factors that can be found by a large PCA of all of the transformed random variables after each set underwent its own PCA.

Applications 
The Helmert-Wolf blocking (HWB) method of estimating linear regression parameters can find an optimal solution only if all cross-correlations between the data blocks are zero. They can always be made to vanish by introducing a new regression parameter for each common factor. The gCCA method can be used for finding those harmful common factors that create cross-correlation between the blocks. However, no optimal HWB solution exists if the random variables do not contain enough information on all of the new regression parameters.

References
 Afshin-Pour, B.; Hossein-Zadeh, G.A. Strother, S.C.; Soltanian-Zadeh, H. (2012), "Enhancing reproducibility of fMRI statistical maps using generalized canonical correlation analysis in NPAIRS framework", NeuroImage 60(4): 1970–1981. 
Sun, Q.S., Liu, Z.D., Heng, P.A., Xia, D.S. (2005) "A Theorem on the Generalized Canonical Projective Vectors". Pattern Recognition 38 (3) 449
Kettenring, J. R. (1971) "Canonical analysis of several sets of variables". "Biometrika" 58 (3) 433

External links
FactoMineR (free exploratory multivariate data analysis software linked to R)

Covariance and correlation
Dimension reduction